is a railway station in the town of Namie, Fukushima, Japan. Due to the Fukushima Daiichi nuclear disaster, services were suspended from 11 March 2011 to 1 April 2017.

Lines

Station layout
Namie Station has a side platform and one island platform connected to the station building by a footbridge. The station is unstaffed.

Platforms

History
Namie Station was opened on 23 August 1898. The station was absorbed into the JR East network upon the privatization of the Japanese National Railways (JNR) on 1 April 1987. The station was closed on 11 March 2011 following the Fukushima Daiichi nuclear disaster. Services between Namie and Odaka resumed on 1 April 2017. Services between Namie and  remain suspended until reopened in March 2020.
It became a unstaffed station from March 14, 2020.

Passenger statistics
In fiscal 2018, the station was used by an average of 24 passengers daily (boarding passengers only). The passenger figures for previous years are as shown below.

Surrounding area
Namie Town Hall
Namie Post Office

See also
 List of railway stations in Japan

References

External links

  

Railway stations in Fukushima Prefecture
Jōban Line
Railway stations in Japan opened in 1898
Stations of East Japan Railway Company
Namie, Fukushima